General elections were held in Paraguay on 14 February 1988. Alfredo Stroessner of the Colorado Party won the presidential elections, whilst the Colorado Party won 20 of the 30 seats in the Senate and 40 of the 60 seats in the Chamber of Deputies. Voter turnout was 92.2%.

These were the first elections held since Stroessner nominally lifted a state of siege in 1987. The state of siege had been in force since he took office in 1954. Despite this, the elections took place in an atmosphere that was little different from past elections during Stroessner's 34-year rule. Opposition leaders were arbitrarily arrested, and opposition meetings and demonstrations were broken up—often brutally. The Colorados were the only party allowed to campaign unhindered. By election day, the only independent media outlets that hadn't been shut down were those operated by the Catholic Church. Under these conditions, most opposition parties urged their supporters to either cast blank ballots or abstain from voting altogether.

As it turned out, these were the last elections under Stroessner, who had won every election since 1954 with more than 70% of the vote. In February 1989, seven months after being sworn in for his eighth term, he was overthrown in a military coup. Fresh elections were held in May 1989, the first time the opposition had been able to contest elections more or less unmolested for over thirty years.

Results

References

Paraguay
1988 in Paraguay
Elections in Paraguay
Presidential elections in Paraguay
Alfredo Stroessner
February 1988 events in South America